The Schreder Airmate HP-10 is an American, high wing, single seat, FAI Standard Class glider that was designed by Richard Schreder. Airmate was the name of Schreder's design company.

Design and development
The HP-10 (HP stands for high performance) was designed by Schreder for the 1961 US Nationals.

The aircraft is built from aluminium and has a V-tail. The constant-chord wing is made up from  eight aluminum honeycomb-sandwich structural panels and has large flaps, using up , or 70%, of the  wingspan. The wing uses a NACA 65 (3)-618 airfoil, the same profile as the HP-8. Some HP-10s were finished with Helisoar-produced fiberglass Hoerner wingtips. The landing gear is a fixed monowheel.

The production rights to the HP-10 were purchased by Helisoar, a company owned by Steve duPont. The company produced a number of kits for the aircraft before production was ended. At least nine kits were completed, most in the Experimental - amateur-built category. Some were registered with the Federal Aviation Administration as Helisoar HP-10s. When Helisoar was liquidated duPont donated all the tooling, parts, drawings and engineering reports to the EAA AirVenture Museum as the Soaring Society of America had no storage space at that time.

Operational history
Schreder and the HP-10 won the Stroukoff Trophy in 1961 for a 57 km/h (35.5 mph) 229 km (142 miles) goal and return flight.

With its high wing loading of 6.75 lb/sq ft (33.0 kg/m2) and small wing area of 114 sq ft (10.6 m2), the HP-10 developed a reputation of being difficult to keep aloft in weak soaring conditions.

In April 2011 there were three HP-10s registered with the FAA, including one in the National Soaring Museum and one in the EAA AirVenture Museum.

Aircraft on display
EAA AirVenture Museum - 1
National Soaring Museum - 1, listed as in storage

Specifications (HP-10)

See also

References

Schreder aircraft
1960s United States sailplanes
Aircraft first flown in 1961
V-tail aircraft